The 1936 New Mexico A&M Aggies football team was an American football team that represented New Mexico College of Agriculture and Mechanical Arts (now known as New Mexico State University) as a member of the Border Conference during the 1936 college football season.  In its seventh year under head coach Jerry Hines, the team compiled a 6–4–1 record (3–2 against conference opponents), finished third in the conference, and outscored opponents by a total of 261 to 118.

Schedule

References

New Mexico AandM
New Mexico State Aggies football seasons
New Mexico AandM Aggies football